Naughty or Nice may refer to:
 Naughty or Nice (album), a 2002 album by 3LW
 Naughty or Nice (film), a 2004 American television film